The 1910–11 season was Blackpool F.C.'s 14th season (11th consecutive) in the Football League. They competed in the twenty-team Division Two, then the second tier of English football, finishing seventh.

Joe Clennell was the club's top scorer, with nineteen goals (eighteen in the league and one in the FA Cup). It was his only season with Blackpool.

Season synopsis
Aside from Clennell's goals haul, a strong start to the campaign (only one defeat in their first nine games, including four wins in their first six) plus a four-game win streak between 12 November and 10 December assisted in Blackpool's top-ten finish. As in the previous season, they beat and drew their two matches against the eventual champions (in this case, West Bromwich Albion).

For the second consecutive season, their FA Cup run ended at the first hurdle after losing to Manchester United. After initially being drawn at home to the Red Devils, Blackpool sold the ground rights to United, hence the tie was played at Old Trafford.

Table

Player statistics

Appearances

League
Fiske 33
Gladwin 35
Goulding 2
Threlfall 18
Connor 31
Clarke 29
Beare 9
Wolstenholme 36
Miller 6
Clennell 32
Cox 28
Dale 9
Dawson 4
Crewdson 30
Morley 27
Bradshaw 8
Hoad 24
Walters 6
Quinn 11
Burt 1
Evans 17
Bainbridge 6
Shaw 4
Thorpe 7
Kidd 5

Players used: 23

FA Cup
Fiske 1
Gladwin 1
Connor 1
Clarke 1
Wolstenholme 1
Clennell 1
Cox 1
Crewdson 1
Morley 1
Bradshaw 1
Hoad 1 

Players used: 11

Goals

League
Clennell 18
Morley 11
Connor 6
Wolstenholme 4
Cox 3
Hoad 3
Bainbridge 1
Beare 1
Miller 1

League goals scored: 48 (plus one own-goal)

FA Cup
Clennell 1

FA Cup goals scored: 1

Transfers

In

Out

Notes

 Miller's goal is not listed in Calley's statistics tallies, only in the scorers for each game

References

Blackpool F.C.
Blackpool F.C. seasons